Heche is a small village in Karnataka state, India.

It may also refer to:

People
In Europe, the surname Heche (variants Hêche, Héche, Hèche), while not a common name, is found throughout France, Switzerland, and Germany. An unrelated East African surname Heche (or Hechei) is found in Kenya and Tanzania.

Notable people with this surname include:
Anne Heche (1969–2022), an American actress
Claude Hêche (born 1952), a Swiss politician
John Heche, a Tanzanian politician
Nancy Heche (born 1937), an American conservative activist, mother of Anne Heche

Places
Pic de la Hèche Castet, part of the Néouvielle massif, in the  Pyrenees mountains in southern France

See also

Hèches